The 3rd Corps of Air Force and Air Defense (Serbo-Croatian: 3. korpus ratnog vazduhoplovstva i protivvazdušne odbrane/ 3. корпус ратног ваздухопловства и противваздушне одбране) was a joint unit of Yugoslav Air Force established in 1964 as 1st Aviation Corps (Serbo-Croatian: 1. vazduhoplovni korpus / 1. ваздухопловни корпус).

History

1st Aviation Corps
The 1st Aviation Corps was formed by order from May 8, 1964, per the "Drvar 2" reorganization plan of the Yugoslav Air Force. It was created by transformation of 1st Air Command and its consolidation with units from 3rd Air Command and 7th Air Command. It consisted of all aviation units from eastern part of Yugoslavia at military airports Batajnica, Lađevci, Niš, Skoplje and Priština.

By order from December 25, 1967, the command of 1st Aviation Corps has been relocated from Zemun to Niš. By order from February, 1986, it was renamed in to 3rd Corps of Air Force and Air Defense.

During this period Dušan Vlaisavljević, Ljubiša Ćurguz, Stevan Roglić, Borivoje Petkov and Miloš Bajčetić were commanders of the 1st Aviation Corps.

3rd Corps of Air Force and Air Defense
The 3rd Corps of Air Force and Air Defense was formed in February 1986, by order to organize three corps of Air Force and Air Defense. The corps area of responsibility was south-east part of Yugoslavia. It's aviation units were based at Niš, Skoplje, Lađevci, Priština and Golubovci military airports.

Units of 3rd Corps of Air Force and Air Defense have participated in combat operations since end of June 1991 as assistance for other corps.

By June 1992 the 3rd Corps of Air Force and Air Defense has been disbanded, and its command was reorganized into command of Aviation Corps of newly formed Air Force of Federal Republic of Yugoslavia.

In this period commanders of 3rd Corps of Air Force and Air Defense were Marko Kulić and Ljubiša Veličković.

Assignments
Command of Yugoslav Air Force (1964-1992)

Previous designations
1st Aviation Corps (1964-1986)
3rd Corps of Air Force and Air Defense (1986-1992)

Organization

1964-1966
1st Aviation Corps
112th Signal Battalion 
359th Engineering Battalion
120th Fighter Aviation Squadron (until 1965)
123rd Fighter Aviation Squadron (until 1965)
235th Fighter-Bomber Aviation Squadron (until 1965)
891st Helicopter Reconnaissance and Liaison Squadron (until 1965)
103rd Reconnaissance Aviation Regiment 
107th Support Aviation Regiment 
119th Support Aviation Regiment 
198th Fighter-Bomber Aviation Regiment
204th Fighter Aviation Regiment 
161st Air Base
165th Air Base
171st Air Base
177st Air Base
285th Air Base
399th Air Base
423th Air Base
492nd Air Base

1966-1978
1st Aviation Corps
112th Signal Battalion 
359th Engineering Battalion
98th Aviation Brigade
107th Support Aviation Regiment (until 1973)
119th Transport Helicopter Regiment (since 1968)
161st Air Base
165th Air Base
171st Air Base
177st Air Base
285th Air Base
399th Air Base
423th Air Base
492nd Air Base

1978-1986
1st Aviation Corps
112th Signal Battalion 
359th Engineering Battalion
350th Reconnaissance Aviation Squadron (until 1982)
461st Light Combat Aviation Squadron (until 1981)
11th Air Defense Division
98th Aviation Brigade
161st Air Base
165th Air Base
171st Air Base
177st Air Base
285th Air Base
399th Air Base
423th Air Base
492nd Air Base

1986-1992
3rd Corps of Air Force and Air Defense
112th Signal Battalion 
359th Engineering Battalion
3rd Air Reconnaissance Regiment 
450th Air Defense Missile Regiment
83rd Fighter Aviation Regiment
98th Aviation Brigade
119th Aviation Brigade
161st Air Base
165th Air Base
285th Air Base
492nd Air Base

Headquarters
Zemun (1964-1967)
Niš (1967-1992)

Commanding officers

References

Corps of Yugoslav Air Force
Military units and formations established in 1964